The United Nations has adopted sets of Standard Minimum Rules addressing the following topics:

Standard Minimum Rules for the Treatment of Prisoners, 30 August 1955
Standard Minimum Rules for the Administration of Juvenile Justice ("The Beijing Rules"), 29 November 1985
Standard Minimum Rules for Non-custodial Measures ("The Tokyo Rules"), 14 December 1990